Instituto Simón Bolívar (ISB) is a private school in Xoco, Benito Juárez, Mexico City. It serves levels nursery through high school (preparatoria).

History
It was founded in 1961, opening on February 2 of that year. The junior high school opened in a new building in 1963. The workshop building with a library, gymnasium, and chemistry laboratories opened in 1966. The high school opened in 1973.

References

External links
 Instituto Simón Bolívar 
 Instituto Simón Bolívar Toluca 

Private schools in Mexico
High schools in Mexico City
High schools in the State of Mexico
Benito Juárez, Mexico City
Toluca
1961 establishments in Mexico
Educational institutions established in 1961